Nina Vaca is an Ecuadorian-born American entrepreneur. She is the chairperson and CEO of Pinnacle Group, which was named the Fastest-Growing Women-Owned Business in the United States by the Women Presidents' Organisation in 2015 and 2018. She served as a Presidential Ambassador for Global Entrepreneurship (PAGE) through the United States Department of Commerce. Vaca is part of the 2016 Class of Henry Crown Fellows. The story of Nina Vaca and Pinnacle Group opens the Entrepreneur chapter of the McGraw-Hill textbook, "Understanding Business". Vaca was named one of the top 100 CEO’s in STEM publication by STEMconnector.

In 2017, Vaca was named a Woman of Distinction by the Women's Business Enterprise National Council and honored as a "Trailblazing Woman in Labor and Business" by the National Women's History Project.

Early life and education
Vaca was born in Quito, Ecuador and is the third child of parents Amanda and Hernan Vaca's five children. The family spent the majority of Vaca's childhood living in Los Angeles, California where her parents owned several small businesses. The family moved to Texas in 1994 following Hernan Vaca's death. Vaca credits her mother's example as being a major influence on herself.

Vaca began college at Texas State University shortly after relocating to Texas and graduated in 1994 with a Bachelor of Arts in speech communications and a minor in business administration. She later completed executive education programs at Harvard Business School – Corporate Governance Executive Program, Tuck School of Business, and Kellogg School of Management at Northwestern. Vaca was named a Distinguished Alumna of Texas State University in 2012, and was the youngest alumna in university history to be honored with this award. Vaca also holds honorary doctorates from Northwood University, Mount Mary University, and Berkeley College.

Career

Early work
Vaca began working at a young age in her family's businesses. Following her father's death, she and her sister, Jessica, ran his travel agency. After college graduation, Vaca moved to New York City to begin work in the IT industry and then relocated to Dallas, Texas to work at Computer Development Services, Inc.

Pinnacle Group
In 1996, Vaca founded Pinnacle Group. The staffing business became one of the fastest growing businesses owned by a woman with a gross revenue of around $1 billion in the 2010s.

Corporate boards
Vaca is a director of Comerica Inc. (2008–present), Kohl's Corporation (2010–present), and Cinemark Holdings (2014–present).

Civic leadership and philanthropy
Barack Obama appointed Vaca as a Presidential Ambassador for Global Entrepreneurship (PAGE) in 2014., an advisory group tasked with growing American entrepreneurship. In this capacity, Vaca traveled with Secretary of State Penny Pritzker to Ghana in May 2014 to promote entrepreneurship globally. Vaca served as chairman of the United States Hispanic Chamber of Commerce from 2010 to 2012.

Personal life
In July 2018, Vaca was sued in a lawsuit filed by Javier Palomarez, former president of the United States Hispanic Chamber of Commerce. Palomarez claims Vaca orchestrated a campaign to destroy his reputation because he ended an alleged affair between the two. Vaca has denied the charges and filed a motion to have the case dismissed.

Appearances
As a PAGE Ambassador, Vaca spoke at the 2016 Global Entrepreneurship Summit. She also participated as a panelist at the Women's Business Enterprise National Council's Conference and Business Fair, which Pinnacle co-chaired. Vaca was invited to speak at the Milken Institute's 2016 Global Conference, and at the Inc. Magazine 5000 Conference in 2016, 2017, 2018.

References

Living people
Businesspeople in information technology
People from Dallas
American women chief executives
American technology company founders
American women company founders
American company founders
Date of birth missing (living people)
Ecuadorian emigrants to the United States
Harvard Business School alumni
Tuck School of Business alumni
Texas State University alumni
Henry Crown Fellows
Year of birth missing (living people)
21st-century American women